Sergio Andrés Otálvaro Botero (born October 12, 1986) is a Colombian professional footballer who plays for Paraguayan Primera División club Club Olimpia as a right-back.

Honours
Santa Fe
Categoría Primera A (2): 2012 Apertura, 2014 Finalización
Copa Colombia (1): 2009
Copa Sudamericana (1): 2015
Superliga Colombiana (1): 2015

Junior
Categoría Primera A (1): 2011 Finalización

References

External links
 
 

1986 births
Living people
Colombian footballers
Colombian expatriate footballers
Colombia international footballers
Association football fullbacks
Footballers from Medellín
Atlético Junior footballers
Deportes Tolima footballers
Independiente Santa Fe footballers
Club Nacional footballers
Club Olimpia footballers
Categoría Primera A players
Paraguayan Primera División players
Colombian expatriate sportspeople in Paraguay
Expatriate footballers in Paraguay